HMS Sylvia was a Doxford three funnel - 30 knot destroyer ordered by the Royal Navy under the 1896 – 1897 Naval Estimates.  She was the sixth ship to carry this name since it was introduced in 1806 for a cutter sold in 1816.

Construction and career
She was laid down on 13 July 1896 at the William Doxford and Sons shipyard at Pallion, Sunderland and launched on 3 July 1897.  During her builder's trials she made her contracted speed requirement.  She was completed and accepted by the Royal Navy in January 1899.

After commissioning she was assigned to the Devonport Flotilla and spent her entire career in Home Waters.

In March 1900 she was commissioned by Lieutenant William Bowden-Smith and the crew of HMS Chamois to take her place in the Instructional Flotilla.

She underwent repairs to re-tube her boilers during spring 1902, and was in the dockyard at Sheerness to repair defects in her steering gear in September that year.

On 30 August 1912 the Admiralty directed all destroyer classes were to be designated by alpha characters starting with the letter 'A'.  Since her design speed was 30-knots and she had three funnels she was assigned to the C class.  After 30 September 1913, she was known as a C class destroyer and had the letter C painted on the hull below the bridge area and on either the fore or aft funnel.

World War I
August 1914 found her in active commission in the 7th Destroyer Flotilla based at Devonport.  In September the 7th Flotilla was redeployed to the Humber River tendered to HMS Leander.  She remained in this deployment for the duration of the First World War.  Her duties included anti-submarine and counter mining patrols.

In 1919 she was paid off and laid-up in reserve awaiting disposal.  HMS Sylvia was sold on 23 July 1919 to Thos. W. Ward of Sheffield for breaking at New Holland, Lincolnshire on the Humber Estuary.

Pennant numbers

References
NOTE:  All tabular data under General Characteristics only from the listed Jane's Fighting Ships volume unless otherwise specified

Bibliography

 

Ships built on the River Wear
1897 ships
C-class destroyers (1913)
World War I destroyers of the United Kingdom